Lousada Rugby Clube is a rugby union team based in Lousada, Portugal. As of the 2012/13 season, they play in the Second Division of the Campeonato Nacional de Rugby (National Championship).

References

External links
Lousada Rugby Clube

Portuguese rugby union teams
Sport in Lousada